"Coma" is a song by Australian ambient house group, Pendulum and released in July 1997 as the third and final single from the group's album, 3 Knocks. "Coma" peaked at number 46 on the ARIA Charts and featured in the Triple J Hottest 100, 1997.

At the ARIA Music Awards of 1997, the song won ARIA Award for Best Dance Release.

The song contains the lyrics "Hug me till you drug me honey;  Kiss me till I'm in a Coma", from the novel Brave New World and from Natural Born Killers, and the lines "Ever since I was born, I've been trained to serve you" and "Am I not all you dreamed I would be?"  from the film "Coming to America."

Track listing

Charts

References

1997 singles
1997 songs
ARIA Award-winning songs